A nose chain is a type of facial jewelry that originated centuries ago in Indus Valley Civilization as part of women's fashion in India.

Physical aspects
Simply put, the nose chain is a link between a nose piercing and an ear-piercing. Typically, these "chains" are just that: chain links, usually (though not always) made of some kind of metal. Yet, besides actual chains, the term "nose chain" can denote other types of connecting materials between the nose and ear piercings, such as the common alternative of rosary beads. Other connectors can be used as well.

History
The nose chain has been commonly worn by women in South Asia and North Africa (Sudan) for centuries. Women in India have been wearing them since before 6th century. It can be evidently seen in many indian sculptures. It is especially significant during wedding ceremonies. Hindu tradition dictates that on the wedding night, the bride wears a nose chain which is hooked by a chain to either the earring or hair. The nose chain is worn by women as to show respect and devotion to Goddess Parvati as she is considered the Goddess of marriage.

Subculture 
Today the nose chain has risen to prevalence as a recent introduction of Gothic fashion and is now known for its use in several different subcultures around the world.

References

Gothic fashion
Body piercing jewellery
Indian fashion
Jewellery of India
Jewellery of Pakistan